Roger Hazard is an American designer, television presenter, and producer best known as the home stager and designer on Sell This House.

Born in Houston, Texas, Hazard attended Texas A&M University and was a member of the university's Corps of Cadets. He studied Horticulture and Architectural Design.

Hazard originated the role of home stager and designer on A&E's Sell This House from its debut in 2003 through 2011.  He has also starred on Move This House and contributed to Sell This House: Extreme, both for A&E.

In 2012, Hazard left A&E and, with husband Chris Stout, launched Roger + Chris, a furniture and home design company.  That same year, the couple relocated from Austin, Texas, to Sharon Springs, New York.

In 2014, the couple completed extensive renovations to their new Victorian home in Sharon Springs.

References

External links

Official Site

American television hosts
Living people
People from Houston
LGBT people from Texas
1959 births